The 2021 Kazakhstan Premier League was the 30th season of the Kazakhstan Premier League, the highest football league competition in Kazakhstan. FC Kairat were the defending champions after winning their third title the previous season. FC Tobol won their second title.

Teams
FC Okzhetpes (relegated after two years in the top flight) was relegated at the end of the 2020 season, whilst FC Irtysh Pavlodar withdrew from the league in May 2020, and as a result also dropped down into the Kazakhstan First Division. They were replaced by FC Aktobe and FC Atyrau after they had spent one season in the Kazakhstan First Division.

Team overview

Personnel and kits

Note: Flags indicate national team as has been defined under FIFA eligibility rules. Players and Managers may hold more than one non-FIFA nationality.

Foreign players
The number of foreign players is restricted to eight per KPL team. A team can use only five foreign players on the field in each game.
For the 2020 season, the KFF announced that players from countries of the Eurasian Economic Union would not be counted towards a club's foreign player limit.

In bold: Players that have been capped for their national team.

Managerial changes

Regular season

League table

Results

Games 1–26

Results by match played

Positions by round

Statistics

Scoring
 First goal of the season: Vitaliy Balashov for Shakhter Karagandy against Atyrau

Top scorers

References

External links
Official website 

Kazakhstan Premier League seasons
1
Kazakh
Kazakh